Punjabi Virsa 2010 was a concert tour by Kamal Heer, Manmohan Waris and Sangtar. It is the seventh Punjabi Virsa tour. They will be touring cities in England and Scotland in June and July 2010 and Canada and United States in September and October 2010. The tour is presented by One World Productions and Plasma Records.

Tour
Kamal Heer, Manmohan Waris and Sangtar arrived in the United Kingdom on June 6 and 7. They played their first and second concerts to sold out crowds at the New Bingley Hall, Birmingham and then Leeds Town Hall, Leeds. Then they played successful concerts in Sunderland and Glasgow with a sold out concert at Leicester. They completed the UK tour with a sold out concert at the Wembley Arena in London. The North American tour has begun with a concert in Calgary on September 11, 2010. The North American tour will have concerts in Canada before concerts in the United States.

Concerts

References

External links
 Official Website
 One World Productions Website

2010 concert tours
Waris Brothers
Punjabi Virsa